Sarratt Creek is a creek in South Carolina, U.S. It is a tributary of Ross Creek, and both creeks flow into the Broad River. It was named in honor of John Sarratt, a settler of Welsh descent. In 1967, its water contained monazite.

References

Rivers of South Carolina